Latisha is a feminine given name. It is similar to Larissa, Tisha or Letitia.

List of people with the given name 

 Latisha Chan (born 1989), Taiwanese professional tennis player
 Latisha Hyman (born 1983), American musician
 Latisha Wilder (born 1975), American bodybuilder

Fictional characters 

 Latisha Daggert, from the British soap-opera Emmerdale
Latisha, from the video game ToeJam & Earl III: Mission to Earth

Given names
Feminine given names
English-language feminine given names
African-American feminine given names